Fengbin Township is a rural township located in Hualien County, Taiwan, bordering Taitung County. The Pacific Ocean lies to the east and the Hai'an Range to the west.

It has the smallest population in Hualien County with around 4,310 inhabitants. The population consists of the indigenous Amis, Kavalan and Sakizaya peoples.

Administrative divisions

 Jingpu Village
 Gangkou Village
 Fengbin Village
 Xinshe Village
 Jici Village

Tourist attractions
Taiwan East Coast National Scenic Area
Xiuguluan River Rafting
Fengbin Tropic of Cancer Marker
Jici seaside resort
Chenghong Bridge Recreation Area
Shitiping Scenic Area
Shitiping Port Whale Watching

Transportation
Provincial Highway No. 11
Provincial Highway No. 11A

References

External links 
 Office of Fung Bin Township 
 Taiwan East Coast National Scenic Area

Townships in Hualien County